Jörgen Ljungberg (born 6 June 1967) is a powerlifter and strongman competitor from Sweden. Jörgen has competed in the World's Strongest Man contest as well as the IPF World Powerlifting Championships on numerous occasions. He has held several European powerlifting records during his career, and has achieved a podium finish at several IPF World Championships.

Jörgen won the 2005 Battle of the Giants, beating several top powerlifters including 2 time IPF World Champion Brad Gillingham.

References

Swedish strength athletes
Swedish powerlifters
1967 births
Living people
World Games bronze medalists
Competitors at the 1997 World Games
Competitors at the 2001 World Games
Competitors at the 2005 World Games